Richard Neil Inwood (4 March 1946 - 14 April 2019) was a Bishop suffragan of Bedford.

Inwood was born in Burton-on-Trent and studied chemistry at University College, Oxford and theology at the University of Nottingham. Before ordination, he  spent a year teaching in north-west Uganda and worked as a research and development chemist with Imperial Chemical Industries (ICI) in Manchester for nearly two years. He served in Sheffield, London, Bath and Yeovil before his appointment in 1995 as Archdeacon of Halifax. He was consecrated a bishop by Rowan Williams, Archbishop of Canterbury at Southwark Cathedral on 7 March 2003.

From 9 April 2014 until 8 April 2015, he was Acting Bishop of Southwell and Nottingham at the request of the Archbishop of York. As acting bishop, Inwood attracted media attention in June 2014 for revoking the permission to officiate of a gay priest, Jeremy Pemberton, who had legally married his partner in spite of a pastoral statement issued by the church's bishops. In August 2014, Pemberton had an offer of work at Sherwood Forest Hospitals NHS Foundation Trust withdrawn following Inwood's refusal to grant the relevant licence.

Inwood was the co-author of Moved by Steam: Beside the tracks and on the trains 1962-67 with Mike Smith (Kettering, 2009 ). His wife, Liz, is a mathematics teacher and examiner.

Inwood died on 14 April 2019.

Styles
Richard Inwood Esq (1946–c1975)
The Revd Richard Inwood (c1975–1995)
The Ven Richard Inwood (1995–2003)
The Rt Revd Richard Inwood (2003–2019)

References

1946 births
Alumni of University College, Oxford
Alumni of the University of Nottingham
Living people
Imperial Chemical Industries people
Bishops of Bedford
Bishops of Southwell
20th-century Church of England bishops